EMHC may refer to:

 Eindhovense Mixed Hockey Club, Dutch field hockey club
 Extraordinary minister of Holy Communion, minister of the Catholic Church